Breda is a city and municipality in the southern part of the Netherlands, located in the province of North Brabant. The name derived from brede Aa ('wide Aa' or 'broad Aa') and refers to the confluence of the rivers Mark and Aa. Breda has 
185,072 inhabitants on 13 September 2022 and is part of the Brabantse Stedenrij; it is the ninth largest city/municipality in the country, and the third largest in North Brabant after Eindhoven and Tilburg. It is equidistant between Rotterdam and Antwerp.

As a fortified city, it was of strategic military and political significance. Although a direct fiefdom of the Holy Roman Emperor, the city obtained a municipal charter; the acquisition of Breda, through marriage, by the House of Nassau ensured that Breda would be at the centre of political and social life in the Low Countries.

History

In the 11th century, Breda was a direct fief of the Holy Roman Emperor, its earliest known lord being Henry of Brunesheim (1080–1125). The city of Breda obtained a municipal charter in 1252. After that Breda had the rights to build fortifications. The city constructed brick walls and Roman-style gates.

In 1327, Adelheid of Gaveren sold Breda to Duke Johannes III of Brabant. In 1350, the fief was resold to Johannes II of Wassenaar (d. 1377). In 1403, the heiress of his line, Johanna of Polanen (1392–1445), married Engelbert I of Nassau (1370–1442; his sarcophagus is in the Grote Kerk in Breda). Through her, the city came into the possession of the House of Nassau, where it remained until 1795, passing to William I of Orange (1533–1584), stadtholder of Holland, Zeeland, and Utrecht and leader of the Dutch revolt. Thus, the baron of Breda was also Count of Nassau in the Holy Roman Empire, Prince of Orange, and (the main) stadtholder in the Dutch Republic (from 1572 to 1650, 1672–1702, 1747–1795). Breda remained part of the barony of Breda until it was captured by French revolutionary forces in 1795.

Residence city

The acquisition of the city by the House of Orange-Nassau marked its emergence as a residentiestad (residence city). The presence of the Orange-Nassau family attracted other nobles, who built palatial residences in the old quarters of the city. The most impressive one, built by the Italian architect Thomas Vincidor de Bologna for the first Dutch prince, was the first renaissance-style palace built north of the Alps. In the 15th century the city's physical, economic and strategic importance expanded rapidly. A great church was built in Brabantine Gothic style with an elegant  tower, called Grote Kerk (main church) or also Onze Lieve Vrouwe Kerk (Church of Our Lady). In 1534 Henry III of Nassau-Breda rebuilt the modest medieval fortifications in impressive style.

In 1534 a fire destroyed over nine tenths of the city, close to 1300 houses, churches, and chapels, and the town hall. Only 150 houses and the main church remained. In July 1581, during the Eighty Years' War, Breda was captured in a surprise attack and siege by Spanish troops then under the command of Claudius van Barlaymont, whose sobriquet was Haultpenne. Although the city had surrendered upon the condition that it would not be plundered, the troops vented their fury upon the inhabitants. In the resulting mayhem, known as Haultpenne's Fury, over 500 citizens were killed. In March 1590, Breda fell back into the hands of the Dutch and Maurice of Nassau, when a 68 men hand-picked force, concealed under the turf of a peat-boat, had contrived to enter the city in a daring plan devised by Adriaen van Bergen (Siege of Breda (1590)). Around 1610 the construction of the Spanish Gate or "Spanjaardsgat" was started as a remembrance to that successful action.

After a ten-month siege in 1624–25, the city again surrendered to the Spaniards, now led by Spinola; the event was immortalized by Diego Velázquez. In the Siege of Breda of 1637 the city was recaptured by Frederick Henry, Prince of Orange, after a four-month siege, and in 1648 it was finally ceded to the Dutch Republic by the Treaty of Westphalia.

In 1646, Frederick Henry founded the Orange College of Breda, modelled on Saumur, Geneva, and Oxford, intending it to train young men of good family for the army and the civil service.

Stuart exiles
The exiled Stuart Charles II of England resided in Breda for a little over a month of his time in exile during the Cromwellian Commonwealth and Protectorate, thanks to the proximity of Charles's sister Mary, Princess Royal and Princess of Orange, the widow of Prince William II of Orange (died 1650).

Based mostly on suggestions by the Parliamentarian General George Monck, Charles II's Declaration of Breda (1660) announced his conditions for accepting the crown of England, which he was to regain a few months later in the year.

Later history

The Treaty of Breda was signed in the city on 31 July 1667, bringing to an end the Second Anglo-Dutch War in which the Dutch faced the same Charles II who had been their guest. Between 1746 and 1748 it was the site of the Congress of Breda, a series of talks between Britain and France aimed at bringing an end to the War of the Austrian Succession, which ultimately led to the signing of the Treaty of Aix-la-Chapelle.

During the Second World War, the city was under German occupation for over four years. During Operation Pheasant Breda was liberated following a successful outflanking manoeuvre planned and performed by forces of 1st Polish Armoured Division of General Maczek on 28 October 1944. Each year during Liberation Day festivities, Breda is visited by a large Polish contingent and the city of Breda reserves a special portion of the festivities for the fallen Polish soldiers. A museum and a monument honoring Maczek and the Polish 1st Armoured Division stands in the city center. General Maczek and many soldiers of his division are buried in the nearby Polish military cemetery.

Breda was the site of one of the first panopticon prison establishments, Koepelgevangenis. This prison housed the only German war criminals ever to be imprisoned in the Netherlands for their war crimes during the Second World War. Known as "", or "Vier von Breda", they were Willy Paul Franz Lages, who was released in 1966 due to serious illness, Joseph Johann Kotälla, who died in prison in 1979, and Ferdinand aus der Fünten and Franz Fischer, who were both released in 1989 and died later the same year.

Administration
 Breda (city) (≈180,000)
  (former village absorbed by city agglomeration)
 Princenhage (former village absorbed by city agglomeration)
 Prinsenbeek (≈11,500) (added at the municipal reorganization in 1997)
 Bavel (≈7,000) (added at the municipal reorganization in 1997)
 Teteringen (≈6,500) (added at the municipal reorganization in 1997)
 Ulvenhout (≈4,700) (added at the municipal reorganization in 1997)

Administration
The city of Breda is divided in 7 city sectors:
 Breda Centrum (Centre)
 Breda West (West)
 Breda Noord-West (Haagse Beemden) (Northwest)
 Breda Noord ( North)
 Breda Oost (East), which includes the Zandberg neighborhood
 Breda Zuid-Oost (Southeast)
 Breda Zuid (South)

Topography

Topographic map image of the city of Breda, March 2014. Click to enlarge.

Economy

Historically, economic activities were mainly industrial. Breda was a center of the food- and drink industry. Companies like Hero (lemonade), Van Melle (Mentos), De Faam (liquorice) and Kwatta (chocolate) are famous throughout Western Europe. Breda also had a sugar factory, supplying its best-known products.

Breda formerly housed the largest brewery in the Netherlands (Oranjeboom). The multinational Interbrew took over the brewery in 1995 and then closed it in 2004. Production of the Breda brand was moved to both Bremen and Leuven until 2008, when Randalls Brewery (in Guernsey) acquired the licence. Guernsey is now the only place in the world where draught Breda is brewed.

However, the decline of industrial activity did not harm the city's economy. Nowadays, Breda is a service oriented economy based on business, trade and logistics. A growing number of international companies choose to establish their head office for Benelux operations and manufacturing in Breda. Examples of these companies are 3M Abbott Laboratories, Alfa Laval, Amgen, Dockwise, ExxonMobil, General Electric, General Motors, Krohne Oil & Gas, Ritchie Bros. Auctioneers, Scania, Texaco, and Toshiba. Furthermore, the city is host to the headquarters of the Royal Netherlands Air Force. Because of its central location between the ports of Antwerp and Rotterdam, the city also attracts logistics companies. Koch Media has its Benelux office in Breda.

The main shopping areas of Breda are the city centre and the southern part of Breda. Known shopping centres are De Barones and 't Sas. Major shopping streets are the Eindstraat, Wilhelminastraat and Ginnekenweg. A market is held on the Grote Markt every Tuesday and Friday from 09:00 to 13:00. A book and antique market is held on Wednesday from 09:00 to 17:00.

Main sights

The city center contains old buildings and portions of the singels (moats) and the harbour. Focal point is the Grote Markt, the main square with pubs and sidewalk cafes.

Park Valkenberg is a major public park, halfway between the main railway station Breda and the Grote Markt.

Major historic buildings include:
 The Grote Kerk (Great Church) or Onze Lieve Vrouwe Kerk (Church of Our Lady), a major example of the Brabant style of Gothic Architecture.
 The Castle of Breda.
 The Begijnhof, a Beguinage.
 Saint Anthony's Cathedral (Sint-Antoniuskathedraal), the cathedral church of the Catholic Diocese of Breda.
 City hall.
 The , a 16th-century water gate.
 The Koepelgevangenis (Breda) (Koepelprison).

Culture
The spoken dialect is West Brabantian, which is very similar to colloquial Dutch.

Musical events are held in the Chasse Theater.

Redhead Day was a festival that took place each first weekend of September. The two-day festival is a gathering of people with natural red hair, but is also focused on art related to the colour red. Activities during the festival are lectures, workshops and demonstrations. The festival attracts attendance from 20 countries and was free due to sponsorship of the local government. Furthermore, some people referred to Breda as the opposite of burning man. As the festival grew bigger they needed a new spot to host the ever growing event. Since 2019 the festival relocated to Tilburg.

Museums
Breda hosts the following museums:
 Begijnhof Breda Museum
 Generaal Maczek Museum
 Maczek Memorial Breda
 Bier Reclame Museum
 NAC Museum
 Heemkundig Museum Paulus van Daesdonck
 Museum Oorlog & Vrede (War and Peace Museum)
 Stedelijk Museum Breda
 Stichting Princenhaags Museum

Events
Breda Dancetour (House Music)
Carnaval
Breda Jazz Festival
BredaPhoto
Singelloop Breda
Redhead Day (Roodharigendag)
Breda Barst
Breda Drijft
Lichtsloepen Parade

Sport

 Breda's football club, NAC Breda, plays in the Eerste Divisie.
 Breda's rugby club, Bredase Rugby Club
 Breda's athletics club, is the largest club of its kind in the Netherlands.
 Breda's Golden Glory, is a kickboxing camp.

Demographics

Religion

As of 2014, the largest religion in Breda is Christianity, comprising 50.4% of its population, the second one being Islam comprising 3.6% of the population. Unaffiliated people comprised 44.9% of the population.

Ethnic groups

The ethnic make-up of Breda, in 2020, is as follows:
Dutch (140,312) (75,45%)
Moroccans (5,712) (3.1%)
Indonesians (5,332) (2.9%)
Turks (3,080) (1.7%)
Belgians (2,940) (1.6%)
Germans (2,661) (1.5%)
Antilleans/Arubans (2,211) (1.2%)
Polish (2,165) (1.2%)
Surinamese (2,058) (1.1%)

Notable residents
 Charles II of England, lived in Breda for most of his exile during the Commonwealth of England. His sister, Mary, Princess Royal and Princess of Orange was widow of Stadtholder William II, Prince of Orange and co-regent for their son William III sovereign Prince of Orange and later King of England, Scotland and Ireland.
 Although neither of them were long-term residents of Breda, it was there, in 1618, that the young René Descartes (at the time, a soldier in the army of Prince Maurice of Nassau) first met, and had extensive conversations with, Dutch philosopher, mathematician, and scientist Isaac Beeckman (then temporarily resident in the town). This interaction with Beeckman seems to have changed the course of Descartes’ intellectual life, eventually leading him to the major innovations in mathematics, science, and philosophy for which he is famous.
 "Colonel" Thomas Parker, the manager of Elvis Presley, born and raised in Breda as Andreas Cornelius van Kuijk.
 Adriaen Cornelissen van der Donck (c. 1618–1655), first lawyer in the Dutch colony of New Amsterdam; a polyglot
 Breda is the birthplace and home to several internationally famous electronic dance music artists including R3hab, Dannic, W&W along with former World No.1 DJs — Tiësto and Hardwell. The title of their 2011 collaboration track, Zero 76 is derived from the dialing code of Breda.
 Breda is also the birthplace of former Olympic swimmer Karin Brienesse and former field hockey player Remco van Wijk, who twice won the gold medal at the Summer Olympics with the Dutch National Team: 1996 and 2000.
 Sculptor Jan De Swart, born in Ginneken, a suburb of Breda, and lived in the area until he emigrated to The United States in 1929
 Breda is the city where the Dutch composers Daan Manneke and Kristoffer Zegers live.
Thomas Simon Cool, Dutch historical and genre painter, resided and taught in Breda 1866-1870
 The Dutch football international Pierre van Hooijdonk played in Breda. Other formerly international Dutch football players from NAC Breda were Antoon (Rat) Verlegh, Kees Rijvers, Kees Kuijs, Leo Canjels, Daan Schrijvers, Frans Bouwmeester, Nico Rijnders, Ad Brouwers, Bertus Quaars, Martin Vreysen and Ton Lokhoff.
 Ramon Dekkers, Muay Thai and Kickboxing World Champion, was born and died in Breda
 , famous Dutch stand-up comedian
 Simone Ferrario, Italian philanthropist, engineer and innovator in valves design and religion 
 Virgil van Dijk, Dutch professional footballer playing centre-back for Liverpool
 Sylvie Meis, Dutch television personality, model and ex-wife of football player Rafael van der Vaart was born in Breda
 Pieter Bruegel the Elder, famous Netherlandish painter
 Kazuha Nakamura, Japanese singer, dancer and ballerina of Le Sserafim. Grew up in Breda. Born in Kōchi, Japan.

Transportation

Trains
Breda has two railway stations, Breda and Breda-Prinsenbeek, providing connections north to (Dordrecht, Rotterdam, Den Haag) and Amsterdam; east to Tilburg, Eindhoven, Den Bosch, Nijmegen and Zwolle; west to Roosendaal and Vlissingen and south to Antwerp and Brussels (via the HSL-Zuid high-speed line). Breda Oost railway station will open after 2020.

Roads
The A16 is a motorway to the north to Rotterdam and towards the south to the Belgian border to Antwerp. The A27 is also a motorway to the north; It connects Breda with Utrecht. Furthermore, The A58 connects Breda with Tilburg and Eindhoven.

Buses
Buses are operated by Arriva. There are four kinds of buses in Breda: citybuses, regional, Volans and long-distance. Citybuses drive only within Breda (sub-12 numbers), regional buses provide connections to nearby towns and cities, Volans buses are more luxurious buses driving to Etten-Leur and Oosterhout (31x and 32x-buses), and long-distance 'Brabantliners' connecting both Gorinchem and Utrecht with Breda (401, 402). There is also one Zeelandish busline (19) which connects Breda with Hulst and Antwerp, operated by Connexxion.

Airport
The small airport Breda International Airport is located west of the city. The airport was opened in 1949 and is in limited use for civil aviation. The departures from the airport are mostly business trips, sightseeing trips and teaching activities.

Twin towns – sister cities

Breda is twinned with:

References
Notes

Literature

External links

 
Cities in the Netherlands
Municipalities of North Brabant
Populated places in North Brabant